Haplogroup J may refer to:
 Haplogroup J (mtDNA), a human mitochondrial DNA (mtDNA) haplogroup
 Haplogroup J (Y-DNA), a human Y-chromosome (Y-DNA) haplogroup